Telerig Nunatak (Nunatak Telerig \'nu-na-tak te-le-'rig\) is a rocky peak of elevation 170 m projecting from the ice cap of Greenwich Island in the South Shetland Islands, Antarctica in the southwest extremity of Dryanovo Heights.

The feature is named after the Bulgarian ruler Khan Telerig, 768-777 AD.

Location

Maps
 L.L. Ivanov et al. Antarctica: Livingston Island and Greenwich Island, South Shetland Islands. Scale 1:100000 topographic map. Sofia: Antarctic Place-names Commission of Bulgaria, 2005.
 L.L. Ivanov. Antarctica: Livingston Island and Greenwich, Robert, Snow and Smith Islands. Scale 1:120000 topographic map.  Troyan: Manfred Wörner Foundation, 2009.

References
 Telerig Nunatak. SCAR Composite Antarctic Gazetteer
 Bulgarian Antarctic Gazetteer. Antarctic Place-names Commission. (details in Bulgarian, basic data in English)

External links
 Telerig Nunatak. Copernix satellite image

Nunataks of Greenwich Island